Andrew Allen Harwood (October 9, 1802 – August 28, 1884) was an admiral in the United States Navy.

Early life and education
Andrew Allen Harwood was born on October 9, 1802 in Settle Farm, Bucks County, Pennsylvania. He was the son of John Edmund Harwood and Elizabeth Franklin Bache. His maternal grandparents were Sarah Franklin Bache and Richard Bache. He was a great-grandson of Benjamin Franklin, one of the Founding Fathers of the United States, and Deborah Read. He had his early education in local schools.

Naval career
At the age of 16, Harwood was appointed a midshipman in the Navy in 1818. From 1819 until 1821 he served in the West Indies on the sloop-of-war USS Hornet in the suppression of the African slave trade. He was detached as special messenger to bring home the ratified treaty with Naples, and from 1835 till 1837 served in the Mediterranean squadron. Two decades of further duty afloat and ashore, including a long assignment with the Bureau of Ordnance and Hydrography, were recognized with Commander's rank in 1848. During 1852–1855 he made a Mediterranean deployment on the frigate Cumberland.

After 1855 Captain Harwood served in shore posts, among them a tour as Chief of the Bureau of Ordnance and Hydrography in 1858–1862. Promoted to commodore in mid-1862, he was in charge of the Washington Navy Yard and the Potomac Flotilla until December 1863.

Commodore Harwood subsequently was appointed as a member of the Board of Examiners and Secretary of the Light House Board, remaining on the job in retired status from October 1864 onward. Beginning in 1869, when he was promoted to rear admiral on the Retired List, he held legal positions, concluding with a year as the Navy's Judge Advocate in 1870–1871.
During retirement he served as secretary of the light house board, and a member of the examining board from 1864 till 1869, when he was made rear admiral on the retired list. During the American Civil War he prepared a work on "Summary Courts-Martial," and published the "Law and Practice of United States Navy Courts-Martial" (1867).

Relatives

He was the nephew of Benjamin Franklin Bache and Richard Bache, Jr. He is a cousin of Richard Wainwright and Richard Wainwright, Jr., both naval officers as well, and Alexander Dallas Bache, Superintendent of the United States Coast Survey.

Death
Rear Admiral Andrew A. Harwood died in Marion, Massachusetts, on August 28, 1884. He is buried in a family plot in Marion, Massachusetts.

Notes

References

1802 births
1884 deaths
United States Navy rear admirals (upper half)
People of Pennsylvania in the American Civil War
Franklin family
United States Naval Academy alumni
Union Navy officers